The City of Melville is a local government area in the southern suburbs of the Western Australian capital city of Perth, east of the port city of Fremantle and about  south of Perth's central business district.

History
Melville was originally established on 14 December 1900 as the East Fremantle Road District under the Roads Boards Act 1871. It was renamed the Melville Road District six months later on 14 June 1901. On 20 July 1923, it received a large amount of land from Jandakot Road District when that entity was abolished.

On 1 July 1961, it became the Shire of Melville following the enactment of the Local Government Act 1960, which reformed all remaining road districts into shires. It was granted town status as the Town of Melville on 28 September 1962, and assumed its current name when it was granted city status on 3 May 1968.

The City of Melville maintains 463 km of roads and 2.10 km² of parks and gardens.

Wards
The City is divided into six wards, each represented by two councillors. Each councillor serves a four-year term, and half-elections are held every two years. The mayor is directly elected.

Applecross-Mount Pleasant Ward
Bateman-Kardinya-Murdoch Ward
Bicton-Attadale-Alfred Cove Ward
Bull Creek-Leeming Ward
Central Ward
Palmyra-Melville-Willagee Ward

Suburbs
The suburbs of the City of Melville with population and size figures based on the most recent Australian census:

(* indicates suburb partially located within City)

Indigenous sites of significance  

There are several significant Noongar sites within the City of Melville precinct. 
 Niergarup
 Quaada Gabee
 Jenalup
 Dyoondalup
 Marradungup
 Wireless Hill

Population

Mayors

Heritage-listed places

As of 2023, 172 places are heritage-listed in the City of Melville, of which 24 are on the State Register of Heritage Places, among them Canning Bridge and Wireless Hill Park.

Sports and recreation

The City is home to 23 active reserves, 100+ passive reserves and two leisure centres featuring indoor courts and 50m and 25m indoor heated pools. The City caters for a diverse number of sporting and recreation codes, including, but not limited to:

Archery 
Athletics
Australian Football
Baseball/Softball/Tee-ball 
BMX 
Bowls
Cricket 
Gaelic Football 
Golf
Hockey 
Homing Pigeon 
Netball
Personal Training/Fitness Groups 
Rowing 
Rugby League and Union 
Soccer/Football
Squash 
Swimming 
Synchronised Swimming
Tennis 
Touch Football
Triathlon Training 
Walking/Running
Water Polo

The City maintains a Community Information Directory which can be used to find locations and contact details for 70+ inclusive sporting and recreation clubs operating within the City of Melville.

Some of the clubs include:

Applecross Cricket Club
Booragoon Junior Football Club
Kardinya Red Sox Ball Club
Kardinya Junior Football Club
 Leeming Spartan Cricket Club
Melville City Football Club
 Winnacott Kats Junior Football Club
Melville City Hockey Club
 Melville City Football Club
 South Shore Swimming Club

References

Notes

Bibliography

External links
 

 
Melville